Wamanmarka (Quechua waman falcon, marka village, also spelled Huamanmarca, Huamanmarka, Wamanmarca) is an archaeological site in Peru.

References 

Archaeological sites in Peru
Archaeological sites in Cusco Region